The Instituto Nacional de Estatística or INE (Portuguese for "National Institute for Statistics") is the government office for national statistics of Portugal. In the English language it is also branded as Statistics Portugal.

The INE is one of the components of the Portuguese National Statistical System (SEN), which also includes the Higher Council of Statistics, the Bank of Portugal and the regional statistical services the autonomous regions of the Azores and Madeira.

It was established in 1935, as the successor of the Direcão-Geral de Estatística (Directorate-General for Statistics) which had been created in 1896.

The first population census known to be done in which is the Portugal of today was done in the year 1 AD by order of the Roman Emperor Caesar Augustus, covering the province of Lusitania. After the foundation of the independent Portugal, many census were done, one of the first relevant known being the Roll of the Crossbowmen done in the 13th century by order of King Afonso III.

The first modern census in Portugal, done accordingly with the scientific methodology established by the First International Statistical Congress, was carried out in 1864. A national census takes place every 10 years, the last one being carried away in 2011 and the next one to be carried away in 2021.

The INE publishes the REVSTAT - Statistical Journal.

The name "Instituto Nacional de Estatística" and the corresponding acronym "INE" is also used as the designation of the central statistical services of several other countries of the Community of Portuguese Speaking Countries, like those of Angola, Cape Verde, Guinea-Bissau, Mozambique and São Tomé and Príncipe.

INE's headquarters
INE is installed in an Art Deco building, designed specifically to serve as its headquarters by architect Porfírio Pardal Monteiro in 1931. The building started to be being built in 1932, being inaugurated in 1935. Being a landmark of the early 20th century Portuguese modern architecture, INE's headquarters was classified as a public interest monument in 2013.

See also
Office for National Statistics
Eurostat
Instituto Brasileiro de Geografia e Estatística
Instituto Nacional de Estatística (Cape Verde)
Instituto Nacional de Estatística (São Tomé and Príncipe)

External links
Instituto Nacional de Estatística

Government of Portugal
Portugal